The Oklahoma Secretary of Environment is a member of the Oklahoma Governor's Cabinet. The Secretary is appointed by the Governor, with the consent of the Oklahoma Senate, to serve at the pleasure of the Governor. The Secretary serves as the chief advisor to the Governor on environmental policy development and implementation.

The last Secretary was Gary Sherrer, who was appointed by Governor Mary Fallin on January 14, 2011.

The current Secretary of the successor office, the Office of the Secretary of Energy and Environment, is Michael Teague.

History
The Office of the Secretary of Environment was established in 1993 to provide greater oversight to the environmental activities of the State government. The Office was established, along with the Oklahoma Department of Environmental Quality, by the Oklahoma Environmental Quality Act of 1993. The Act directed the Secretary of Environment ensure that state environmental agencies management activities are well coordinated and of high quality.

The offices of the Office of the Secretary of Energy and the Office of the Secretary of the Environment were merged in 2013, creating the Office of the Secretary of Energy and Environment.

Responsibilities
The Secretary of Environment is responsible for overseeing the development, management and protection of the natural resources and wildlife of the State. The primary duties assigned to the Secretary by law are as follows:
Any duties and powers assigned by the Governor
Recipient and administrator of Federal Clean Water Act funds
Coordinate pollution control activities to avoid duplication of effort
Act on behalf of the public as trustee for natural resources
Serve as the State's Trustee for Natural Resources

As the State's official Trustee for Natural Resources, the Secretary ensures that natural resources and the services they provide that are injured or lost because of contamination are restored for the benefit of the State.

As of fiscal year 2012, the Secretary of Environment oversees 981.9 full-time employees and is responsible for an annual budget of $590 million.

Office of Secretary
The Secretary heads the Office of the Secretary of Environment, which is a state agency. The Mission Statement of the Office is:
The Environmental Mission of the State of Oklahoma, as adopted by the state's environmental agencies, is to protect and enhance Oklahoma's environment and natural resources through preservation, conservation, restoration, education and enforcement in order to maintain and improve the environmental quality and natural beauty of our state and better the standard of living for all Oklahomans.

Staff
The staff of the Office serves as the immediate staff to the Secretary. Although well funded, the Office has a very limited staff: only four full-time employees including the Secretary. As of 2012, the following are the authorized positions within the Office:
Secretary of Environment
Director of the Office of the Secretary of Environment
Special Assistant to the Secretary
Environmental Grants Manager

Budget
The Office of the Secretary has a very large budget for the size of its staff. For Fiscal Year 2013, with only 4 employees, the Office has an annual budget of $12 million. Less than $350 thousand of that budget is actually dedicated to employee compensation and operating expenses. The remaining $11.65 million (or 95%) of the budget is used as grants for State and local agencies with environmental responsibilities.

The vast majority of the funds to support the Office comes from the Environmental Protection Agency, particularly under the authority of the Clean Water Act. Only 1% of the budget comes from yearly appropriations from the Oklahoma Legislature, with 99% as grants coming from the United States federal government.

Salary
The annual salary of the Secretary of Environment is one of the few Cabinet Secretary positions which is not set by law. As such, it is left to the Governor to determine the Secretary's salary. Despite this, if the Secretary serves as the head of State agency, the Secretary receives the higher of the two salaries. Currently Secretary Sherrer has elected to not receive compensation while serving as secretary.

Agencies overseen
The Secretary of Environment oversees the following state entities:

The Secretary represents the Governor of Oklahoma before the following entities:

Air Quality Council
Arkansas-Oklahoma Arkansas River Compact Commission
Arkansas River Basin Interstate Committee
Bioenergy Initiative
Canadian River Commission
Central Interstate Low-Level Radioactive Waste Compact Commission
Compliance Advisory Panel
Environmental Finance Authority
Hazardous Waste Management Advisory Council

Kansas-Oklahoma Arkansas River Compact Commission
Laboratory Services Advisory Council
Lead Impacted Communities Relocation Assistance Trust
Radiation Management Advisory Council
Red River Compact Commission
Solid Waster Management Advisory Council
Water Law Advisory Committee
Water Quality Management Advisory Council
Water Research Institute
Water Resources Research Coordinating Committee

The Secretary also oversees the Clean Energy Independence Commission, the Encouraging Conservation in Oklahoma (ECO) Task Force and various other conservation and sustainability efforts of the State government.

List of Secretaries

See also
Clean Water Act
Comprehensive Environmental Response, Compensation, and Liability Act
Environmental Protection Agency
Oil Pollution Act of 1990

References

External links
Office of the Secretary of Environment website

Environment of Oklahoma
Environment, Office of the Secretary of the
State environmental protection agencies of the United States
Environment
Environment